Bohack (full company name "H.C. Bohack", sometimes informally referred to as "Bohack's") was a chain of grocery stores located in the New York City area that opened in 1887 and closed in 1977. They were headquartered in Maspeth, Queens. The founder, Henry C. Bohack, opened the first store on Fulton Street in Brooklyn. Throughout the 1960s, Bohack purchased Daitch Shopwell, Packers, and several other supermarket businesses. Stores throughout the company's existence were located in New York City, on Long Island, in Westchester County, New York, and Fairfield County, Connecticut. Bohack also owned and incorporated gas stations in the 1920s and 30s.

In 1977 Ar-Bee Food Equipment of LIC, NY Purchased all of Bohack's Food Equipment during the warehouse auction/liquidation on Metropolitan Avenue.
Most of the equipment was re-sold by Ar-Bee to other supermarket owners before it left the dock. Ar-Bee removed the rest and stored it in their LIC, NY warehouse.
Ar-bee rebuilt and sold equipment to Supermarkets in Metro-NYC and LI, Remaining items were stripped and used for service/repair by Ar-Bee's service department. ASI Food Equipment Repairs.

Use in media
The Bohack location at 87th St and 2nd Ave was featured in The Odd Couple when Felix went in and did shopping for his and Oscar's date night with the “Coo-coo” Pigeon sisters.

Sopranos season 6
Tony: (digging with shovel) Halfway ta China...there's nuthin' here.
Uncle Junior: Forty thousand I had. My share of the Bohack's haul from the seventies.

References 

Companies based in New York City
Economy of the Northeastern United States
Supermarkets of the United States
Retail companies established in 1887
Defunct retail companies of the United States
United States
Retail companies disestablished in 1977
1887 establishments in New York (state)
1977 disestablishments in New York (state)
American companies established in 1887
American companies disestablished in 1977